Over to You may refer to:

 Over to You: Ten Stories of Flyers and Flying, 1946 book by Roald Dahl
 "Over to You" (song), a song from the 1978 studio album Never Say Die! by Black Sabbath
 Over To You, horse that was an Olympic medalist in equestrian for team eventing

See also 
 "Over To You Now", a song from the 2005 extended play Britney & Kevin: Chaotic by Britney Spears